Rafael Alkorta Martínez (born 16 September 1968) is a Spanish former professional footballer who played mainly as a central defender. He is the current sporting director of Athletic Bilbao.

Having represented Athletic Bilbao and Real Madrid during a 17-year professional career, he amassed La Liga totals of 370 matches and eight goals, winning three trophies with the latter club.

Alkorta appeared in three World Cups with the Spain national team during the 1990s.

Playing career

Club
Born in Bilbao, Biscay, Alkorta began playing as a child with local Athletic Club in 1978, and made his senior debut with the second team seven years later, making 44 Segunda División appearances before being promoted by Howard Kendall to the senior side for the 1987–88 season. His first La Liga match was a 1–0 away defeat against Real Valladolid on 24 October 1987, and he went on to feature in a further 171 while establishing himself as an outstanding man marker.

Alkorta attracted the attention of Real Madrid, for whom he signed in the 1993–94 campaign (he was reluctant to make the move, but was persuaded due to Athletic's poor financial situation which was improved by the 350 million pesetas transfer fee). During his spell at the Santiago Bernabéu Stadium he formed a notable partnership with Fernando Hierro for club and country, and accumulated more than 150 official appearances and two league titles.

Alkorta returned to Athletic in 1997–98, swapping teams with fellow defender Aitor Karanka. He helped the Basque side to finish second in the first campaign upon his return and went on to play regularly the following years but, after only six games in 2001–02, was released and decided to retire aged nearly 34.

International
An international since 26 May 1990 (a 1–0 friendly away win over Yugoslavia), Alkorta earned 54 caps for Spain over the next eight years. He played in three FIFA World Cups – 1990, 1994 and 1998 – and UEFA Euro 1996, also representing the country at under-16, under-18 and under-21 levels.

In the first competition, in Italy, Alkorta played ten minutes in a 2–1 group stage victory against Belgium, starting in a further 11 matches (ten complete) in the other senior tournaments.

Coaching and administrative career
Alkorta worked as an assistant manager to former Real Madrid teammate Míchel at Olympiacos F.C. and Olympique de Marseille. In December 2018, following the election of Aitor Elizegi as the president of Athletic Bilbao, he was installed as the club's new sporting director, working with Andoni Ayarza and replacing the long-serving José María Amorrortu.

Personal life
Alkorta's younger brother, Óscar, was also a footballer who was a midfielder. A fellow Athletic Bilbao youth graduate (alongside José Félix Guerrero who also had a more famous sibling in the first team), the younger Alkorta never made it past the reserves and played out his career in the Segunda División B. The brothers were on the staff at Athletic together for a few months in 1997, between Rafael's return from Madrid and Óscar's move to CD Aurrerá de Vitoria. Óscar later worked as a youth coach at Athletic Bilbao, working under his older sibling from 2019.

Rafael's son Iker received some media attention for modelling work in 2017.

Honours
Real Madrid
La Liga: 1994–95, 1996–97
Supercopa de España: 1993; Runner-up 1995

References

External links

1968 births
Living people
Spanish footballers
Footballers from Bilbao
Association football defenders
La Liga players
Segunda División players
Bilbao Athletic footballers
Athletic Bilbao footballers
Real Madrid CF players
Spain youth international footballers
Spain under-21 international footballers
Spain international footballers
1990 FIFA World Cup players
1994 FIFA World Cup players
1998 FIFA World Cup players
UEFA Euro 1996 players
Basque Country international footballers
Spanish expatriate sportspeople in Greece
Spanish expatriate sportspeople in France
Athletic Bilbao non-playing staff
Spanish sports executives and administrators